The Lithuania national football team represents Lithuania in association football and is controlled by the Lithuanian Football Federation (LFF), the governing body of the sport in the country.

The team's largest victory came on 20 May 1995 when they defeated Estonia 7–0. Their worst loss is 10–0 against Egypt in 1924.

Matches

1990

1991

1992

1993

1994

1995

1996

1997

1998

1999

2000

2001

2002

2003

2004

2005

2006

2007

2008

2009

2010

2011

2012

2013

2014

2015

2016

2017

2018

2019

Notes

References

External links
Lithuania - International Results
Reports for all matches of Lithuania national team

Lithuania national football team
2000s in Lithuanian sport
2010s in Lithuanian sport